Murad Inoyatov (born November 13, 1984) is a professional Uzbekistani tennis player.

Inoyatov reached his highest individual ranking on the ATP Tour on May 11, 2009, when he became World number 437.  He primarily plays on the Futures circuit and the Challenger circuit.

Inoyatov has been a member of the Uzbekistani Davis Cup team since 2003, posting a 3–8 record in singles and a 3–5 record in doubles in fifteen ties played.

Inoyatov represented Uzbekistan at the 2006 and 2010 Asian Games, winning the silver medal in the Men's Team event at the 2010 Games.

Satellite, Future and Challenger finals

Singles: 5 (3–2)

Doubles 25 (12–13)

External links

1984 births
Living people
Uzbekistani male tennis players
Sportspeople from Tashkent
Tennis players at the 2006 Asian Games
Tennis players at the 2010 Asian Games
Asian Games medalists in tennis
Asian Games silver medalists for Uzbekistan
Medalists at the 2010 Asian Games
20th-century Uzbekistani people
21st-century Uzbekistani people